D-Day was the day of the Normandy landings on June 6, 1944.

D-Day may also refer to:
 D-Day (military term)

Films and television
 Roommates (2006 Korean film) or D-Day, a Korean horror film
 D-Day (2013 film), a Bollywood film
 D-Day (TV series), a 2015 Korean drama
 D-Day, a character in the movie Animal House

Games
 D-Day (game), a board game
 D-Day (1984 video game)
 D-Day (video game), a 2004 real-time strategy game
 D-Day: The Great Crusade, a board wargame
 Axis & Allies: D-Day
 Brothers in Arms: D-Day (2006)

Comics 
 Jour J (comics), a French comic book series

Other uses
 "D-Day" (poem), an Irish language poem by Pól Ó Muirí
"D-Days" (Hazel O'Connor song), 1981
 D-Day (D-Lite EP), 2017
 D-Day (Kim Dong-han EP), 2018
 D-Day, a musical duo made up of TommyD and Roger Sanchez
 "D-Day", a song by Blondie from the album Panic of Girls
 Decimal Day, 15 February 1971, in the United Kingdom and in Ireland when the currency changed from pounds, shillings, and pence to decimal.
 D-Day: A Gangsta Grillz Mixtape (Dreamville LP), 2022

See also
 "D-Day Dodgers", a 1944 term for those Allied personnel who fought in Italy during World War II
 Oklahoma D-Day, one of the world's largest games of paintball